Drillbit is a low-budget short horror film directed by Alex Chandon and stars Ben Bethell, Tom Cox and Saul Brignell.

Plot
An employee detects a pharmaceutical company's sinister plan within the executive office, he will be wiped out with his entire family. Only his son Brian survives the horrific attack, although he has a drill bit rammed into his  skull and recognizes only one thought: revenge!

Cast
 Ben Bethell		
 Saul Brignell		
 Bill Corbett William 'Bill' Corbett as Zombie Raver
 Tom Cox		
 Just		
 Neil Keenan as Biker Gang Member / Aids Mutant
 Miranda Morten		
 Lino Raffa as Goon
 Dominic Hailstone
 Matt "Magnum 'The rat'" Russell

Production
The film was narrated by Jim Van Bebber and the Special FX was created from Duncan Jarman and Dominic Hailstone.

References

External links

1992 films
1992 horror films
Zombie short films
British horror short films
Films directed by Alex Chandon
1990s English-language films
1990s British films